The Stepmother or The Step-Mother is a 1663 tragicomedy by the English writer Robert Stapylton. It was first staged by the Duke's Company, premiering at the Lincoln's Inn Fields Theatre.

The original cast included Samuel Sandford as Sylvanus, Thomas Betterton as Filamor, John Young as Adolph, Cave Underhill as Tetrick, Joseph Price as Fromund, William Smith as Crispus, Matthew Medbourne as Capito, Mary Betterton as Caesarina, Moll Davis as Violinda and Jane Long as Brianella.

References

Bibliography
 Van Lennep, W. The London Stage, 1660-1800: Volume One, 1660-1700. Southern Illinois University Press, 1960.

1663 plays
West End plays
Comedy plays
Plays by Robert Stapylton